Lucille & Friends is the thirty-fourth album by B.B. King released in 1995. On it, he is accompanied by major jazz, rock, and blues artists who collaborated on these songs over the past 25 years.

Track listing
"When Love Comes to Town" (With U2) - 4:16
"Playin' with My Friends" (With Robert Cray)
"To Know You Is to Love You" (With Stevie Wonder)
"Caught a Touch of Your Love" (With Grover Washington Jr.)
"All You Ever Give Me Is the Blues" (With Vernon Reid)
"You Shook Me" (With John Lee Hooker)
"Spirit in the Dark" (With Diane Schuur)
"Can't Get Enough" (With Mick Fleetwood and Stevie Nicks) - 4:52
"Since I Met You Baby" (With Gary Moore) - 2:51
"B.B.'s Blues" (With Branford Marsalis) - 10:02
"Better Not Look Down" (With The Crusaders)
"Frosty" (With Albert Collins)
"Hummingbird" (With Leon Russell and Joe Walsh)
"Ghetto Woman" (With Gary Wright and Ringo Starr)
"Let the Good Times Roll" (With Bobby Bland)

Charts

References

B.B. King compilation albums
1995 compilation albums
MCA Records albums